I Am the Messiah is the only album by MC Honky, released in 2002. Supposedly a middle-age disc jockey from Silverlake, California, MC Honky is promoted by, and widely considered to be, Mark Oliver Everett (or "E") of Eels.

To support the album, an actor would open Eels shows as Honky, to "prove" that he and E were two separate persons. E and MC Honky also engaged in a comic feud on the Internet, in which E hoped MC Honky would catch SARS.

The creator of the MC Honky artwork and videos is Ivan Brunetti.

Guests on the album include Eels drummer Butch, Eels bassist Koool G Murder, and Joey Waronker. An animated music video was made for "Sonnet No. 3 (Like a Duck)" and included on the enhanced CD.

Track listing
"Sonnet No. 3 (Like a Duck)" (Sir Rock-a-Lot and Sir Whacks-a-Lot) – 4:25
"Hung Up" (Sir Rock-A-Lot and Sir Whacks-A-Lot) – 3:41
"The Object" (Sir Rock-A-Lot and Playboy Gigolo Bandit) – 3:20
"A Good Day to Be You" (Sir Rock-A-Lot and Sir Whacks-A-Lot) – 3:39
"Baby Elephant Rock-A-Bye" (Wally Gagel and Sir Rock-A-Lot) – 4:28
"What a Bringdown" (Sir Rock-A-Lot and Playboy Gigolo Bandit) – 3:50
"Only a Rose Pt. I" (Rudolf Friml and Brian Hooker) – 2:24
"My Bad Seed" (Sir Rock-A-Lot and Playboy Gigolo Bandit) – 3:36
"The Devil Went Down to Silverlake" (Gagel and Sir Rock-A-Lot) – 3:28
"Soft Velvety 'Fer"(L'il Fer, Sir Rock-A-Lot, and Sir Whacks-A-Lot) – 3:53
"The Baby That Was You" (Sir Rock-A-Lot and Sir Whacks-A-Lot) – 3:44
"3 Turntables & 2 Microphones" (Sir Rock-A-Lot and Sir Whacks-A-Lot) – 4:09
"Only a Rose Pt. II" (Friml and Hooker) – 2:00

Japanese edition bonus 7" single
"The Object" (Sir Rock-A-Lot and Playboy Gigolo Bandit) – 3:25
"What a Bringdown" (Sir Rock-A-Lot and Playboy Gigolo Bandit) – 3:51
"Hung Up" (Sir Rock-A-Lot and Sir Whacks-A-Lot) – 4:05
The Japanese release includes an unplugged set recorded for Xfm radio.

Personnel
Musicians
Butch – Drums and percussion
Koool G Murder – Bass guitar, backing vocals, vocals on "A Good Day to Be You"
Li'l Fer – Vocals on "Soft Velvety 'Fer"
MC Honky – Vocals
Joey Waronker – Drums and percussion

Production
Curt Anderson – Programming and engineering
Ryan Boesch – Programming and engineering
Wally Gagel – Production,programming, and engineering
Bernie Grundman – Mastering
Francesca Restrepo – Art direction
Joey Waronker – Programming and engineering

Release history
November 4, 2002 (Australia)
March 31, 2003 (Europe)
April 8, 2003 (US)
June 25, 2003 (Japan)

References

External links
 

2002 albums
Eels (band)
Albums produced by Mark Oliver Everett
Electronic albums by American artists
Liberation Records albums
Imperial Records albums
SpinART Records albums